"Got to Get It" is a song by German group Culture Beat from their second studio album, Serenity (1993). Written by Nosie Katzmann, Jay Supreme, Torsten Fenslau and Peter Zweier, it was released as the second single from the album on 13 September 1993. The song was a hit in many European countries, peaking at number-one in Belgium and Finland. It was also a top 5 hit in Denmark, Germany, Ireland, Italy, Lithuania, Spain, Sweden, the Netherlands and the UK. In the UK, the US and Canada, the song peaked at number-one on the dance music charts.

Critical reception
AllMusic editor William Cooper viewed "Got to Get It" as a "virtual rewrite" of "Mr. Vain". Larry Flick from Billboard described it as a "wickedly catchy twirler that appears poised to follow the trend-setting "Mr. Vain" to the top of club playlists and on to top 40 formats". He added, "The song's hook will instantly stick to the brain, while the plethora of pop/rave beats will sneak up the spine." He also felt that it sports a better chorus than its predecessor and "aggressive, synth-soaked beats", and said the "blend of party-down male rapping and cute female-belting is familiar and fun." Alan Jones from Music Week gave it four out of five, commenting, "'Got to get it out of my head' they sing, and you'll be thinking the same when you hear this surefire hit follow-up", where "throbbing Hi-NRG, though with a light vocal touch, and a typical Snap!-style rap all come together to create an instant and likeable smash." 

James Hamilton from the RM Dance Update declared it as "another overly similar bland synth buzzed chugger". Mike Soutar from Smash Hits also gave the song four out of five. He felt it was better than "Mr. Vain", saying, "So it is with great surprise that I actually find myself liking "Got to Get It". Buzzy, fast, with a smashing whiplash sample, it's a corking dance tune that's approximately 50 times better than 2 Unlimited's "Faces"." Sunday Mirror wrote, "After a day spent humming Culture Beat's incredibly catchy follow up to their chart-topper "Mr Vain", you'll agree with the lyric, Got to get it out of my head." The reviewer concluded with that the song is "high-energy pop" and "a surefire smash both on the dance floor and in the charts."

Chart performance
"Got to Get It" was very successful on the charts across several continents. In Europe, it peaked at number-one in both Belgium and Finland, and was a top 10 hit in Austria (7), Denmark (4), France (10), Germany (4), Ireland (3), Italy (5), Lithuania, the Netherlands (2), Norway (6), Spain (2), Sweden (5), Switzerland (7) and the UK. In the latter, the single reached number four on November 7, 1993, in its second week on the UK Singles Chart. It spent two weeks at that position, while peaking at number-one on the UK Dance Singles Chart. On the Eurochart Hot 100, the single also entered the top 10, peaking at number three, while peaking at number one on the European Dance Radio Chart. Outside Europe, "Got to Get It" peaked at number-one on both the Canadian RPM Dance/Urban chart and the US Billboard Dance Club Songs chart. In Israel, it was a top 5 hit, peaking at number five. In Australia and New Zealand, the song reached number seven and 13. 

The single was awarded with a gold record in Germany and Australia, with a sale of 250,000 and 35,000 singles, respectively.

Airplay
"Got to Get It" was positioned at number six when the first European airplay chart Border Breaker was compiled due to crossover airplay in West Central-, West-, North West-, North- and South-Europe. The single went on to hit number-one on 21 November 1993, where it stayed for four weeks. It peaked at number-one on Music & Media European Dance Radio Top 25 on 20 November 1993.

Music video
A music video was produced to promote the single, directed by Martin Person. It tells the story of two lovers ending their relationship, intertwined with flashbacks to the days when they were in love. The video was filmed in Algarve, Portugal, and in Denmark. It received heavy rotation on MTV Europe in November 1993.

Track listing and formats

 7-inch vinyl single (Netherlands, 1993)
 "Got to Get It" (Radio Mix) — 3:39
 "Got to Get It" (Video Edit) — 3:52

 12-inch vinyl single (United States, 1994)
 "Got to Get It" (Raw Deal Mix) — 5:34
 "Got to Get It" (Club To House Mix) — 5:52
 "Got to Get It" (Hypnotic Mix) — 7:17
 "Got to Get It" (Resolution Mix) — 7:35

 CD maxi single (Europe, 1993)
 "Got to Get It" (Raw Deal Mix) — 5:34
 "Got to Get It" (Club Mix) — 6:01
 "Got to Get It" (Extended Album Mix) — 6:39
 "Got to Get It" (Hypnotic Mix) — 7:17
 "Got to Get It" (Radio Mix) — 3:39

 CD maxi single - Remix (Europe, 1993)
 "Got to Get It" (Funlab Mix) — 6:36
 "Got to Get It" (Club To House Mix) — 5:52
 "Got to Get It" (TNT Party Zone Mix) — 5:41
 "Got to Get It" (Basic House Mix) — 6:22
 "Got to Get It" (Last Minute Mix) — 6:56
 "Got to Get It" (Radio Remix) — 4:09

 CD maxi single, Promo (US, 1994)
 "Got to Get It" (Original Radio Edit) — 3:39
 "Got to Get It" (Edit w/o Rap) — 3:03
 "Got to Get It" (Remix Radio Edit) — 4:18

Charts and certifications

Weekly charts

Year-end charts

Certifications

References

1993 songs
1993 singles
Culture Beat songs
English-language German songs
Music Week number-one dance singles
Number-one singles in Belgium
Number-one singles in Finland
Songs written by Torsten Fenslau
Songs written by Jay Supreme
Songs written by Nosie Katzmann
Dance Pool singles